Fine Clothes is a 1925 American silent comedy film directed by John M. Stahl and starring Lewis Stone, Percy Marmont, and Alma Rubens. It is based on a play adapted from Ferenc Molnár's original.

The film's sets were designed by the art director Cedric Gibbons.

Plot
As described in a film magazine review, Peter operates an elaborate haberdashery when his wife elopes with his clerk and bank account. Peter soon becomes bankrupt and is given work by the Earl of Denham, who flirts with Paula, Peter's former cashier. Paula has accompanied Peter to the Earl's estate to work. Peter shields Paula from the Earl's advances, so the Earl sets Peter up in business to get rid of him. However, Paula follows Peter, and drives away the two elopers when they return in an effort to gain Peter's favor.

Cast

References

Bibliography
 Munden, Kenneth White. The American Film Institute Catalog of Motion Pictures Produced in the United States, Part 1. University of California Press, 1997.

External links

1925 films
1926 comedy films
1926 films
Silent American comedy films
Films directed by John M. Stahl
American silent feature films
1920s English-language films
First National Pictures films
Films set in London
American films based on plays
American black-and-white films
1925 comedy films
1920s American films